Danyang railway station is a railway station on the Jinghu and Shanghai-Nanjing Intercity railways. The station is located in Danyang City, Zhenjiang, Jiangsu, China. "Danyang railway station" now refers to two separate, but adjacent stations that are situated on either side of parallel regular (Beijing–Shanghai railway) and high-speed tracks. The "old" station serves regular trains, while the "new" station (referred to by locals as "大火车站" or "big train station") serves high-speed trains on the Shanghai-Nanjing Intercity High-Speed Railway. Danyang North railway station lies on the Beijing–Shanghai high-speed railway.

History
The station opened in 1907. The current "old" station was built in 1958, to replace the original station, which was made necessary by the rebuilding of a branch of the Grand Canal. The new station was opened on 1 July 2010 with the Shanghai-Nanjing Intercity Railway. It has two platform tracks and two passing tracks. The old station has been rebuilt and was reopened on 1 February 2018 with high platforms, a new waiting room and other facilities, new entrances and passenger tunnels connecting the two stations. One of the old platforms was converted into garden beds, so it now has two platform tracks and three passing tracks.

References

Railway stations in Jiangsu
Railway stations in China opened in 1907
Stations on the Beijing–Shanghai Railway
Stations on the Shanghai–Nanjing Intercity Railway
Railway stations in Zhenjiang